Major Bikash Malla Thakuri (born 15 August 1986) is a retired footballer, army officer and football coach from Nepal. Bikash Malla is currently the goalkeeping coach of Nepal national football team. Experienced goalie Malla is major (सेनानी) by rank in Nepal Army and was skipper of the team. His goalkeeping skills have always been the cream of the crop. He was one of the most commanding players in the Nepal national football team.

After graduating from ANFA Academy, Malla joined Friends Club in 2060 B.S. He stole the limelight when Samsung JYC bought him in the highest price for the league season 2061/62. Malla then joined Laxmi Hyundai MMC in 2062 and played for a year before joining Nepal Army.

Malla - who has 19 caps - played his debut match for Nepal National team in 2005 in SAFF Championship, Karachi.

In June 2014 Malla was the winning captain as the Nepal Army Club won 3–1 over archrivals Nepal Police Club in the 2014 Bir Ganesh Man Singh Gold Cup Final. As the winning team the Nepali Army Club will receive 5 Lakhs (500,000 rupees) prize.

References 

1985 births
Living people
People from Chitwan District
Nepalese footballers
Nepal international footballers
Association football goalkeepers